Umbrina reedi is a species of ray-finned fish within the family Sciaenidae. It is endemic to the southeastern Pacific Ocean, where it is found off the Juan Fernandez Archipelago and Isla San Felix in the Desventuradas Islands, inhabiting rocky shores at depths up to 30 meters. The maximum length of the species has been recorded at 77 centimeters.

Conservation 
Umbrina reedi has been classified as a 'Least concern' species by the IUCN Red List. Despite its restricted distribution, the species has no known major threats that can severely impact it. Local fisherman are known to catch the species using gill nets, but there is no data that suggest this reduces the current population of the fish.

References 

IUCN Red List least concern species
Fish described in 1880
Fish of Chile
Fish of the Pacific Ocean
Sciaenidae